Farmer Boy is a children's historical novel written by Laura Ingalls Wilder and published in 1933. It was the second-published one in the  Little House series but it is not related to the first, which that of the third directly continues. Thus the later Little House on the Prairie is sometimes called the second one in the series, or the second volume of "the Laura Years".

Plot summary

The novel is based on the childhood of Wilder's husband, Almanzo Wilder, who grew up in the 1860s near the town of Malone, New York. It covers roughly one year of his life, beginning just before his ninth birthday and describes a full year of farming. It describes in detail the endless chores involved in running the Wilder family farm, all without powered vehicles or electricity. Young as he is, Almanzo rises before 5 am every day to milk cows and feed stock. In the growing season, he plants and tends crops; in winter, he hauls logs, helps fill the ice house, trains a team of young oxen, and sometimes — when his father can spare him — goes to school. The novel includes stories of his brother, Royal, and sisters, Eliza Jane and Alice.

Historical background

Since Almanzo (1857–1949) was born in February 1857, the novel is set in 1866–1867, before Laura's birth (1867–1957). It features Almanzo's brother, Royal (1847–1925), and sisters, Eliza Jane (1850–1930) and Alice (1853–1892). Meanwhile, he also had a sister named Laura (1844–1899), who at the time and events in the novel was already about 22 and had presumably moved out. He later had a brother named Perley Day (1869–1934), who was not yet born at the time the novel is set.

Reception 

Virginia Kirkus established her pre-publication review service and its semimonthly bulletin Kirkus Reviews (a later name) in January 1933. As book editor from 1926, she had handled Wilder's debut novel Little House in the Big Woods for Harper & Brothers, which had published it early in 1932 and cut its children's department as an economy measure some months later, for about a year. According to its online archive, Kirkus provided a short review of this novel in the issue dated October 1, 1933, which was also its publication date at Harper: "A juvenile As the Earth Turns. The story of a vanishing phase of American life, with delightful illustrations by Helen Sewell." As the Earth Turns by Gladys Hasty Carroll was released by Macmillan on May 2 with advanced sales of 20,000 and as the Book-of-the-Month Club selection for May. It featured one year on a family farm in Maine. 

The Boyhood Home of Almanzo Wilder near Malone is operated by the Almanzo and Laura Ingalls Wilder Association as an interactive educational center, museum, and working farm. It was listed on the National Register of Historic Places in 2014.

Notes

References

External links

 
 Little House Books at HarperCollins Children's Books
 Almanzo & Laura Ingalls Wilder Association

Little House books
1933 American novels
Children's historical novels
Novels set in New York (state)
Novels set in the 1860s
Harper & Brothers books
1933 children's books